The Yamaha CS-15 is a Monophonic analog synthesizer produced by Yamaha from 1979 to 1982.

In the CS series, the CS-5, CS-10, CS-30 and CS-30L were similar in sound, structure and design (the all had similar black casing). The 5 and 10 had a single oscillator and one multimode (lowpass/bandpass/highpass) filter, whereas the 15/30/30L had two oscillators that could be routed in various ways through two multimode filters.

Architecture
It features two voltage-controlled oscillators, two 12 dB/Oct multi-mode Voltage-controlled filter (Low-Pass, High-Pass or Band-Pass), two ADSR envelopes and a Low-Frequency Oscillator. It also features a White noise and an external-in for processing other sounds.

The CS-15 offers a great flexibility with various routing possibilities to the filters and envelopes. You can, for example, rout VCO 1 to both VCFs and the VCFs to any of the envelopes positive or negative voltage.

It's actually a duophonic / bitimbral synthesizer but you have to connect it two separate CV/Gate controls (Hz/V like Korg synthesizers not V/Oct) to play the extra voice.

Notable users
The CS-15 was used by several bands in the early 1980s. The Human League made prominent use of the instrument on their album Dare. Marillion used a CS-15 on their first full-length album, Script for a Jester's Tear. It was also used by Astral Projection, Somatic Responses, The Moog Cookbook, and Vince Clarke (of Erasure). 

Boyd Jarvis, a producer and early pioneer of house music, started out with a CS-15 as his first synthesizer.

See also
 CS-60
 CS-80

References

Yamaha products
Monophonic synthesizers
Analog synthesizers